Thomas Ashby Spicer (June 1876 – January 1958) was an English professional footballer who appeared in the Football League for Woolwich Arsenal as a goalkeeper.

Career statistics

References

1876 births
1958 deaths
Footballers from Brighton
English footballers
Association football goalkeepers
Sheppey United F.C. players
Brighton United F.C. players
Arsenal F.C. players
Brentford F.C. players
Leyton F.C. players
Southern Football League players
English Football League players
Brentford F.C. non-playing staff